St. Mary's Church and Rectory may refer to:

in the United States
(by state)
 St. Mary's Episcopal Church and Rectory (Milton, Florida), listed on the NRHP in Florida
 St. Mary's Church and Rectory (Iowa City, Iowa), listed on the NRHP in Iowa
 St. Mary's Church and Rectory (Delaware, Ohio), listed on the NRHP in Ohio

See also
St. Mary's Church (disambiguation)